The House Party franchise consists of American comedies, based on a short film written/directed by Reginald Hudlin in 1990. The franchise consists of the original short film, three theatrical releases (the first film and its first two sequels), two straight-to-home video sequels, and one theatrical continuation movie. The events of each installment centers around high school teenagers, who are tasked with responsible duties ranging from studying for class to house-sitting, but instead go against the regimented instructions and plan large parties to increase their popularity at school; while eventually leading to comedic unfortunate circumstances. The plot additionally involves these characters' attempts to fame, in the Hip-hop/Rap music industry.

The short was received in 1983 with warm reception, with Kevin Thomas of the Los Angeles Times stating: "Reginald Hudlin's House Party!, [is] a stylish and witty look at teen-age behavior...", which spawned the overall franchise. The first theatrical film that followed was met with critical acclaim, and has since been credited as noteworthy of a milestone in African American representation and affluence in film history. With its historical significance, House Party has since been labeled and earned its status as cult classic. The sequels that followed have been met with respective diminishing reception, with criticisms pointed at their quality, when compared to the original release.

The franchise continues with the release of House Party.

Films

House Party (1990)

Play's parents are out of town, and he's planning a house party to end all others. His best friend named Kid wants to attend more than anything as the prettiest and most popular girl at school, Sydney, will also be there. They work together to plan something memorable, but when Kid gets into a fight at school, his father grounds him. Determined to no miss out on the event of the school-year, Kid rebelliously sneaks out of the house and faces a series of unfortunate circumstances as he make his way to the party. Kid strives to ensure he arrives, before the party is over.

House Party 2 (1991)

Rapper-turned-scholar Kid, gets accepted into collegiate schooling. Excited for the new adventure, he quickly hits a stumbling block when he runs out of cash as classes are about to start. Desperate for funds, he looks for ways to earn money. After spending some time working at the school cafeteria, Kid decides to plan another party with Play. Together, the friends organize a late-night event where the women can enter by dressing scantily clad, while men must pay to enter. As the party begins, one event after the last causes issues. The friends work together to ensure that Kid makes the money he is in need of.

House Party 3 (1994)

After their share of exploits, best friends Kid and Play are faced with growing up. Kid is marrying his girlfriend Veda, and Play is doing his best to continue having success in the music industry. Kid works with his fiancé in preparing for the wedding; Play plans a bachelor party while also attending to his trouble-making younger cousins while also managing a new all-female rap group called Sex as a Weapon. The friends strive to create successful events, all while moving on into adulthood.

House Party 4: Down to the Last Minute (2001)

The teenage, musical-aspiring Jon "Jon-Jon" Harris, Jr. volunteers for the responsibility of house-sitting his wealthy Uncle Charles Lester's mansion. While the latter is away on a business trip, Jon-Jon is asked to have no visitors nor to drive his uncle's platinum colored Mercedes-Benz 430  luxury vehicle. Jon-Jon calls his two best friends Mark and T, collectively known as the hip hop group named IMx, and together they enjoy the comforts of the his uncle's income. The trio take the car for a drive after getting caught up in the aspirations of popularity, and plan a party for all of their classmates. The group convince a record label executive to attend the entertainment event, and rehearse their routine for their performance. As the event begins and their concert rages, Jon-Jon discovers that his uncle is coming home sooner than expected. The friends race against time, attempting to get everything back to the way it was, hiding their hijinks while he was away.

House Party: Tonight's the Night (2013)

Chris Johnson and his best friend Dylan are two teenage amateur rappers. As their high school experience comes to an end, Chris prepares to go to college. Together they realize that their chance for a final experience with their peers is immanent. The pair plan their party, while Chris tries to finally win the affections of the girl he has had a crush on since their time in second grade; Autumn Rose. As the party commences, with local celebrity hip-hop artists Christopher "Kid" Robinson, Jr. and Peter "Play" Martin in attendance, a series of unexpected disasters ensue. Chris and Dylan work together, to salvage the night as best they can.

House Party (2023)

In February 2018, it was announced that a relaunch of the House Party film series was in development. With a script co-written by Stephen Glover and Jamal Olori, the story is described as: "definitely not a reboot. It's an entirely new...House Party." LeBron James and Maverick Carter are signed as producers. The project will be a joint-venture production between Warner Bros. Pictures, New Line Cinema, SpringHill Company and HBO Max Original Films. The film is intended to be released exclusively on HBO Max via streaming. In September 2019, Charles "Calmatic" Kidd II signed onto the production as director, marking the filmmakers feature film directorial debut. Principal photography commenced in July 2021. In August 2022, the movie was rescheduled for a theatrical release, after previously having been scheduled for July 28, 2022 release exclusively via streaming. It was also previously scheduled for a December 9, 2022 release.

It was released on January 13, 2023.

Short film

Written/directed/produced by Reginal Hudlin as a 20-minute short as a thesis during his time as a college student at Harvard University, House Party! was released independently by the filmmaker. Centering around a teenager who defies the wishes of his strict father and sneaks out of his house at night to attend a party with his friends and peers.

Despite its indie-distribution, Hudlin's short received recognition by winning first place with a $1,500 total prize at the fourth annual Black Independent Video and Film-maker's Awards sponsored by which is related to the official film archives of the Western States Black Research Center. Following the successes of the short film, Reginald Hudlin and his brother Warrington Hudlin started developing the script for a feature film adaptation, at the request of New Line Cinema.

Main cast and characters

Additional crew and production details

Reception

Box office and financial performance

Critical and public response

References 

Film franchises